Luís Carlos Lourenço da Silva (born 5 June 1983), known as Lourenço, is a former professional footballer who played as a forward.

Club career

Sporting CP
Lourenço was born in Luanda, Angola. A Sporting CP youth graduate, he made his professional debut in England, serving two brief loan spells first at Bristol City then Oldham Athletic, both in the Football League One. Additionally, he played and scored regularly for Sporting's reserves.

Lourenço made three appearances and scored once for Sporting in the 2003–04 UEFA Cup, making his Primeira Liga debut on 16 August 2003 in a 2–1 away win against Académica de Coimbra and scoring in the game (he found the net in the season's first three official matches). However, he gradually lost his importance in the squad, and spent the next years on loan to several clubs in the country.

Later years
Lourenço was released by Sporting in the summer of 2006, signing for Vitória de Setúbal. In the following January transfer window he moved countries again, joining Greek side Panionios FC, initially on loan. After signing permanently for two years he hardly received any playing time, being released on 1 July 2009.

After a short and unassuming spell back in Portugal, Lourenço moved abroad again, signing in January 2011 with UD Alzira in the Spanish Segunda División B. He reunited at the club with former Sporting teammate Beto, and both were released in June after the team's relegation, having appeared in a combined total of three games.

International career
Lourenço was picked for the Portuguese under-21 squads at two UEFA European Championships, 2004 and 2006. Additionally, he represented the nation at the 2004 Summer Olympics and the 2005 Vale do Tejo International Tournament (B team).

Lourenço eventually switched allegiance to Angola, earning his only cap on 10 August 2011 by coming on as an 85th-minute substitute for Manucho in a 0–0 friendly in Liberia.

Honours
Sporting CP
Taça de Portugal: 2001–02

References

External links

1983 births
Living people
Portuguese sportspeople of Angolan descent
Footballers from Luanda
Portuguese footballers
Angolan footballers
Association football forwards
Primeira Liga players
Liga Portugal 2 players
Segunda Divisão players
Sporting CP B players
Sporting CP footballers
C.F. Os Belenenses players
U.D. Leiria players
Vitória F.C. players
Moreirense F.C. players
S.C. Farense players
C.D. Pinhalnovense players
Atlético Clube de Portugal players
English Football League players
Bristol City F.C. players
Oldham Athletic A.F.C. players
Super League Greece players
Football League (Greece) players
Panionios F.C. players
A.O. Kerkyra players
Segunda División B players
UD Alzira footballers
Liga I players
CSM Corona Brașov footballers
Portugal youth international footballers
Portugal under-21 international footballers
Portugal B international footballers
Angola international footballers
Olympic footballers of Portugal
Footballers at the 2004 Summer Olympics
Portuguese expatriate footballers
Angolan expatriate footballers
Expatriate footballers in England
Expatriate footballers in Greece
Expatriate footballers in Spain
Expatriate footballers in Romania
Portuguese expatriate sportspeople in England
Portuguese expatriate sportspeople in Greece
Portuguese expatriate sportspeople in Spain
Portuguese expatriate sportspeople in Romania
Angolan expatriate sportspeople in Romania
Portuguese football managers
Angolan football managers
C.D. Fátima managers